The first round of AFC matches for 1994 FIFA World Cup qualification was played from 9 April to 7 July 1993, to determine the six teams which would play for the two available 1994 FIFA World Cup slots for AFC.

Group stage

Group A

Iraq advanced to the Final Round.

Group B

Iran advanced to the Final Round.

Group C

North Korea advanced to the Final Round.

Group D

South Korea advanced to the Final Round.

Group E

Saudi Arabia advanced to the Final Round.

Group F

Japan advanced to the Final Round.

Teams qualified for final round
With all of Iran, North Korea and Iraq qualifying for the final round fears were expressed in the United States of those countries potentially turning up at their tournament, since the three nations at the time were under economic sanctions by the United States.

References

 
Qual
AFC